Lycée Germaine Tillion may refer to:
 Lycée Germaine Tillion (Le Bourget) in the Paris metropolitan area
 Lycée Germaine Tillion (Sain Bel) - Sain Bel 
 Lycée Germaine Tillion (Thiers) - Thiers, France